General David Colyear, 1st Earl of Portmore,  (c. 1656 – 2 January 1730) was a Scottish general and Governor of Gibraltar.

Early life
He was the elder son of Sir Alexander Colyear or Robertson, of the family of Strowan, Perthshire, who settled in Holland, where he acquired a considerable property, and preferred the name of Colyear.

Career
Colyear was commissioned into the Army of William of Orange in 1674, becoming Lieutenant-General of the Scots Brigade, the three Scottish regiments which had been fighting in the service of the Netherlands for many decades.

He led the troops ashore when William landed at Torbay on 5 November 1688 and then served in most of William's Irish campaigns, being made Governor of Limerick in 1691. For his service in Ireland he was created Lord Portmore on 1 June 1699. In 1702, he obtained the rank of major-general, and on 27 February 1703 received the command of the Queen's Royal Regiment of Foot, later the 2nd Foot. On 13 April 1703, he was raised to the dignities of Earl of Portmore, Viscount of Milsington, and Lord Colyear.

He took part in the War of Spanish Succession and participated in the Battle of Cádiz in 1702 and the Battle of Vigo Bay later that year.  In 1710, he was appointed commander-in-chief of the forces in Scotland, and in January 1711 was raised to the rank of general. In 1712, he served under the Duke of Ormonde in Flanders, and the same year he was named a member of the privy council and made a Knight of the Thistle.

In August 1713, he was constituted Governor of Gibraltar (gazetted November 1714), and in October of the same year he was chosen one of the sixteen representative peers of Scotland. When Gibraltar was besieged by the Spaniards in 1727, he embarked for that place to assume command, but on the approach of Admiral Wager with eleven ships the siege was raised.

Personal life

He married Catherine Sedley, Countess of Dorchester, daughter of the former Lady Catherine Savage (a daughter of John Savage, 2nd Earl Rivers) and poet Sir Charles Sedley, 5th Baronet, of Southfleet, Kent. Catherine, a former mistress of James II, had been created Countess of Dorchester for life in 1686. Together, they were the parents of two sons:

 David Colyear, Viscount Milsington (1698–1728/9), who married Bridget Noel, only daughter of Hon. John Noel (second son of Baptist Noel, 3rd Viscount Campden) and Hon. Elizabeth Ingram (widow of Edward Ingram, 2nd Viscount Irvine, sister of Bennet Sherard, 1st Earl of Harborough, and eldest daughter of Bennet Sherard, 2nd Baron Sherard), in 1724.
 Charles Colyear, 2nd Earl of Portmore (1700–1785), who married Juliana Osborne, Duchess of Leeds, widow of Peregrine Osborne, 3rd Duke of Leeds, the daughter and heiress of Roger Hele, of Halewell.

He died 2 January 1730 and was succeeded in the earldom by his second won, Charles.

Arms

References

Attribution

External links
 
The Queen's Royal Surrey Regimental Association

British Army generals
Earls of Portmore
Peers of Scotland created by William II
Knights of the Thistle
Members of the Privy Council of Great Britain
British military personnel of the War of the Spanish Succession
Year of birth uncertain
1730 deaths
Queen's Royal Regiment officers
Royal Scots Greys officers
Scottish representative peers
1656 births
British people of Scottish descent